Kuzmadino is a rural locality (a selo) in Krasnoselskoye Rural Settlement, Yuryev-Polsky District, Vladimir Oblast, Russia. The population was 301 as of 2010. There are 5 streets.

Geography 
Kuzmadino is located on the left bank of the Koloksha River, 3 km south of Yuryev-Polsky (the district's administrative centre) by road. Yuryev-Polsky is the nearest rural locality.

References 

Rural localities in Yuryev-Polsky District